Grigory Davidovich Khakhanyan (January 10, 1896 – February 22, 1939) was a Georgian-born ethnic Armenian Soviet komkor (corps commander). He fought in the Imperial Russian Army in World War I before going over to the Bolsheviks during the subsequent Civil War. During the Great Purge, he was arrested on February 1, 1938, and executed the following year.

Bibliography
 Great Soviet Encyclopedia
 Советская военная энциклопедия
 Хаханьян Григорий Давидович // Военный энциклопедический словарь. Москва, 1973
 Аветисян Г. Незабвенные имена // «Коммунист» № 182 от 2 августа 1988 г. Ереван
 Айрапетян Г. А. Комкор Хаханьян. Ереван, 1970
 Кедров А. Трижды герой // ВЧ. 1971. 4 января
 Савина Н. Комбриг Хаханьян // ВЧ. 1981. 24 июля
 Евланов В. А., Петров С. Д. Почетным оружием награждённые. Москва, 1988
 Василевский А. М. Дело всей жизни. Издание третье. Москва, Политиздат, 1978
 Ахназарян М. Армяне в Рязани / Голос Армении" от 22 марта 2007.
 Материалы о военачальниках Г. Д. Хаханьяне и Г. К. Восканяне: [Публ. документов, 1921—1932 гг. ] // Вести. Ереван, университета: Обществ, науки. 1972. № 2. С. 170—181
 Янгузов З. Ш. Комиссары «нашенского» края. Благовещенск, 1975.
 Краснознамённый Киевский. Очерки истории Краснознамённого Киевского военного округа (1919—1979). Издание второе, исправленное и дополненное. Киев, издательство политической литературы Украины. 1979. С. 82.
 
 
 

1896 births
1939 deaths
People from Tiflis Governorate
Russian military personnel of World War I
Soviet military personnel of the Russian Civil War
Soviet komkors
Great Purge victims from Georgia (country)
People executed by the Soviet Union
Armenian people from the Russian Empire
Georgian people of Armenian descent